Colin Duncan McNab (6 April 1902 – 25 November 1970, also spelled MacNab) was a Scottish footballer who played as a right half for Dundee, Arbroath and Scotland.

References

Sources

External links

1902 births
1970 deaths
Scottish footballers
Scotland international footballers
Dundee F.C. players
Arbroath F.C. players
Association football wing halves
Footballers from Edinburgh
Footballers from East Ayrshire
Scottish Football League players
Scottish Football League representative players
Musselburgh Athletic F.C. players
Scottish Junior Football Association players